Florin Lucian Cernat (born 10 March 1980) is a Romanian former professional footballer who played as a midfielder and playmaker. He made 14 appearances for the Romania national team scoring two goals.

Club career

Oțelul Galați & Dinamo București 
Florin Cernat started his professional career at Oțelul Galați. In 2000, he was noticed by Dinamo Bucharest.

Dinamo ended up buying him. The rising star was played most of the entire 2000–01 season, appearing for 25 out of 30 league matches. He helped the team finish second in the league and qualify for the UEFA Cup. Cernat also participated in the team's UEFA Champions League 2000-01 campaign, which ended prematurely in the second round.

Dynamo Kyiv 
During that period, Dynamo Kyiv's coach, Valeriy Lobanovskiy was looking for players to replace the stars that he had recently sold. This included Andriy Shevchenko and Kakha Kaladze to AC Milan, Serhii Rebrov to Tottenham Hotspur, and Oleh Luzhnyi to Arsenal. In July 2001 Cernat transferred to Dynamo Kyiv, where he contributed to the team and won many titles.

Returning from loan to Dynamo, Cernat was rarely able to prove himself under new coach Yuri Semin. On 24 December 2008, Cernat announced that he would leave Kyiv in the summer after 8 years.

One of his most notable games for Dynamo occurred in the 2004–05 UEFA Champions League, Group Stage game 2 (28 September 2004) against Bayer Leverkusen. Cernat came off as a substitute and scored the third and fourth goal for Dynamo in a 4–2 victory at Olympiskiy stadium.

Hajduk Split 
With new coach Anatoliy Demyanenko in 2005, Florin Cernat came out of favour with the coach and rarely saw the field. For the 2007–08 season, Demyanenko loaned him off to the Croatian Premier League club Hajduk Split for a transfer fee of 312,000 £. There, his team earned second place in the Croatian Cup, losing in the final to Dinamo Zagreb.

After the completion of the Ukrainian Premier League 2008-09 season Cernat signed new deal with his former club Hajduk Split.

Kardemir Karabükspor 
In August 2010 he signed a five-year deal with Turkish Süper Lig club Kardemir Karabükspor.

Çaykur Rizespor 
In March 2013, he signed for newcomers Çaykur Rizespor. He immediately was given the number 10 and was awarded the captainship. Cernat helped his side to get promoted to the Süper Lig.

Return to Oțelul 
In September 2014, Cernat accepted the offer to return to Oțelul Galați, the first club of his career. He signed a contract for a season, with an option to extend the deal for an extra season.

Style of play 
Cernat was known for his excellent passing play, great vision on field, and highly precise free-kicks and exceptional dribbling ability.

Career statistics 

Scores and results list Romania's goal tally first, score column indicates score after each Cernat goal.

Honours 
Dinamo București
 Divizia A: 1999–2000
 Cupa României: 1999–2000

Dynamo Kyiv
 Ukrainian Premier League: 2000–01, 2002–03, 2003–04, 2006–07, 2008–09
 Ukrainian Cup: 2002–03, 2004–05, 2005–06, 2006–07
 Ukrainian Super Cup: 2004, 2006
 Independent States Cup: 2002

Hajduk Split
 Croatian Cup: 2009–10

FC Voluntari
 Cupa României: 2016–17
 Supercupa României: 2017

References

External links

 
 
 
 Florin Cernat at Nogometni Magazin 

1980 births
Living people
Sportspeople from Galați
Romanian footballers
Association football midfielders
ASC Oțelul Galați players
FC Dinamo București players
FC Dynamo Kyiv players
HNK Hajduk Split players
Kardemir Karabükspor footballers
Çaykur Rizespor footballers
FC Viitorul Constanța players
FC Voluntari players
Liga I players
Ukrainian Premier League players
Croatian Football League players
Süper Lig players
TFF First League players
Romanian expatriate footballers
Expatriate footballers in Ukraine
Expatriate footballers in Croatia
Expatriate footballers in Turkey
Romanian expatriate sportspeople in Ukraine
Romanian expatriate sportspeople in Croatia
Romanian expatriate sportspeople in Turkey
Romania under-21 international footballers
Romania international footballers